Máximo González and Horacio Zeballos were the defending champions, but chose not to participate together. González played alongside Fabrice Martin, but lost in the first round to Pablo Andújar and Pedro Martínez. 

Zeballos teamed up with Marcel Granollers and successfully defended the title, defeating Guillermo Durán and Juan Ignacio Londero in the final, 6–4, 5–7, [18–16].

Seeds

Draw

Draw

References

External links
 Main draw

Argentina Open - Doubles
ATP Buenos Aires